Frankish  may refer to:

 Franks, a Germanic tribe and their culture
 Frankish language or its modern descendants, Franconian languages
 Francia, a post-Roman state in France and Germany
 East Francia, the successor state to Francia in Germany
 West Francia, the successor state to Francia in France
 Crusaders
 Levantines (Latin Christians)

See also 
 Name of the Franks
 Franks (disambiguation)
 Franconian (disambiguation)

Language and nationality disambiguation pages